Vettucaud is located on the north-west coast of Thiruvananthapuram. The Madre de deus church vettukad is situated here. This church is popularly known as Vettucaud Palli.

The annual feast of the church called 'Feast of Christ, the King', is attended by thousands of devotees. The feast is celebrated in the month of November. The last day of the feast is celebrated on the third Sunday of November every year. The grand feast is attended by thousands of devotees and is celebrated with a procession through the parish boundaries.

Vettucuad is located 3 km North from Shanghumugham Beach and 5 km away from the  Thiruvananthapuram International Airport.

Suburbs of Thiruvananthapuram
Tourist attractions in Thiruvananthapuram district